Gangemi is a surname. Notable people with the surname include:

Daniele Gangemi (born 1980), Italian film director
Joseph Gangemi, American screenwriter and writer
Kenneth Gangemi (born 1937), American writer
Santo Gangemi (born 1961), Vatican diplomat 
Thomas Gangemi (1903–1976), American mayor
Salvatore Gangemi (1968), American lawyer